Laatsgevonden is a town in Makhado Local Municipality in the Limpopo province of South Africa.

References

Populated places in the Makhado Local Municipality